Chenia is a genus of mosses belonging to the family Pottiaceae.

The genus name of Chenia is in honour of Pan Chieh Chen (1907 - 1970), a Chinese botanist (Bryology).

The genus was circumscribed by Richard Henry Zander in Phytologia Vol.65 oon page 424 in 1989.

The genus has cosmopolitan distribution.

The genus contains three species:
Chenia leptophylla 
Chenia lorentzii 
Chenia subobliqua

References

Pottiaceae
Moss genera